The Aztec dancer (Argia nahuana) damselfly is one of the pond damsels. The dark black stripe on the side of the thorax is forked from front to back. Other field marks include blue postocular spots, pale blue legs with a black stripe, and a blue ring on the seventh segment of the abdomen.

References

External links
 Argia nahuana on BugGuide.Net

Coenagrionidae
Insects described in 1902